Raden Panji Mohammad Noer (January 13, 1918 in Sampang Regency – April 16, 2010) was the Indonesian Governor of East Java from 1967 to 1976. He was also ambassador to France from 1976 to 1980.

References

1918 births
2010 deaths
People from Sampang Regency
Governors of East Java
Ambassadors of Indonesia to France